L. Eudora Pettigrew was an American postsecondary educator and academic administrator who served as the president of the State University of New York at Old Westbury. She was the first African-American college president in the SUNY system when she was named president of SUNY Old Westbury in 1986.

Early Life and Education 
Pettigrew was born in Hopkinsville, Christian County,  KY in 1928.  Her mother was a school teacher and her father a licensed County Farm agent. Pettigrew earned a bachelor’s degree from West Virginia State College in 1950 and master’s and doctorate degrees from Southern Illinois University.

Career 
From 1966 to 1970, Pettigrew  served as Assistant Professor of Psychology at the University of Bridgeport in Connecticut from. 

From 1970 to 1980, she was the chairwoman and professor of Urban and Metropolitan Studies at Michigan State University. In that role, Pettigrew was the first African American to serve as chair of any department at Michigan State University.

From 1980 to 1986, she works as the associate provost of instruction and professor of urban affairs and public policy at the University of Delaware and held this position until taking a role at SUNY Old Westbury. When Pettigrew was named associate provost, she became the first Black person named to a high administrative post at the University. 

In 1986, she was named the President of SUNY Old Westbury and served in that role from until 1998 

Pettigrew served as Chair of the International Association of University Presidents (IAUP)/United Nations Commission on Disarmament Education Conflict Resolution, and Peace, which promotes global awareness and competence as well as peace and international understanding through education. She served from 1996 to 2002 for the IAUP on the UNESCO Peace Program in Palestine. Pettigrew was the European Center’s chair for the IAUP program in Austria on human rights, democracy, peace, and tolerance.

Pettigrew was awarded Doctor of Philosophy honoris causa degrees from University Pretoria, South Africa, Holy Family College, and Western Connecticut State University.

References 

University of Delaware faculty
Michigan State University faculty
State University of New York faculty
American chief executives of education-related organizations
West Virginia State University alumni
Southern Illinois University alumni